

 

Miriam Lau Kin-yee  (former married name Miriam Lau Lau Kin-yee; born 27 April 1947) was a member of the Legislative Council of Hong Kong (Legco), representing the transport industry functional constituency. Lau was the acting-chairperson of Legco from 2004 to 2008.

Lau was the chairwoman of the Liberal Party after James Tien's resignation following the party's poor performance in the 2008 Hong Kong legislative election until 2012, when she stood down for the same reason: in that election, the party secured only 2.64 percent of the popular vote. She also lost her own seat, having stood in the geographical constituency of Hong Kong Island, rather than in the (safer) option of her existing functional constituency.

Lau is a solicitor and was with the law firm of Alfred Lau, her ex-husband, from 1979 to 2001. Lau currently is a consultant with the law firm King & Wood Mallesons, specialising in litigation.

Early life 
Miriam Lau was born on 27 April 1947 in Guangzhou, China.

See also
 Politics of Hong Kong

References

External links
 Legco profile (2000–04)

1947 births
Living people
Alumni of the University of Hong Kong
Solicitors of Hong Kong
Delegates to the 11th National People's Congress from Hong Kong
Delegates to the 12th National People's Congress from Hong Kong
Officers of the Order of the British Empire
Recipients of the Gold Bauhinia Star
Leaders of political parties
Members of the Regional Council of Hong Kong
Liberal Party (Hong Kong) politicians
People's Republic of China politicians from Guangdong
Politicians from Guangzhou
Members of the Provisional Legislative Council
HK LegCo Members 1988–1991
HK LegCo Members 1991–1995
HK LegCo Members 1995–1997
HK LegCo Members 1998–2000
HK LegCo Members 2000–2004
HK LegCo Members 2004–2008
HK LegCo Members 2008–2012
Hong Kong women lawyers
University of Macau alumni
Members of the Selection Committee of Hong Kong
20th-century Chinese politicians
21st-century Chinese politicians
20th-century Hong Kong people
21st-century Hong Kong people